Ladislav Fuks (September 24, 1923 in Prague – August 19, 1994 in Prague) was a Czech novelist. He focused mainly on psychological novels, portraying the despair and suffering of people under German occupation of Czechoslovakia.

Fuks was born in Prague on September 24, 1923, the son of Vaclav Fuks (a police officer) and Marie Frycková Fuksová. He studied the Gymnasium in Truhlářšká ulice, where he also first witnessed Nazi persecution of his Jewish friends. In 1942 he was forced to be a caretaker in Hodonín, as a part of the Arbeitseinsatz.

Later he studied philosophy, psychology and art history at the Philosophical faculty of Charles University in Prague, where, in 1949, he received a doctorate. After his studies, he was a member of the National heritage administration and after 1959 he worked in the national gallery. He became a professional writer in the 1960s. He attracted much attention with his debut work, Pan Theodor Mundstock (Mr. Theodore Mundstock), published in 1963, and a year later with his short story collection Mí černovlasí bratři (My dark-haired brothers).

During the communist period, Fuks said he "preferred to choose conciliatoriness and toleration over reckless defiance and courage to fall in the resistance". Some of his work from the 1970s is strongly linked to the era in which it was created; for example, Návrat z žitného pole (The Return from the Rye Field) is a novel targeted against emigration after the 1948 communist coup. He was also a member of the socialist  Union of Czech Writers. Although he obtained some international recognition, in the last years of his life he was left alone and friendless. He died in 1994 in his Prague apartment in the Dejvice neighborhood, at Národní obrany no. 15.

List of works

 Zámek Kynžvart (Castle Kynžvart) – 1958: A professional study
 Pan Theodor Mundstock (Mr. Theodore Mundstock) -1963: The story of a Prague Jew who is in constant fear of deportation to the concentration camp. He tries to prepare himself—he sleeps on a wooden plank, tortures himself with hunger, and carries heavy things. He also lives through frequent hallucinations and conversations with his own shadow.
 Mí černovlasí bratři (My dark-haired brothers) -1964: The story of a boy who loses all his Jewish friends through the occupation—a collection of short stories, marking their individual fates.
 Variace pro temnou strunu (Variations for a dark string) -1966: The story of the life before the occupation of Czechoslovakia by the Germans through the eyes of a small boy. Reality mixes into a blend with ideas from fairy tales, stories and rumors the young boy hears from their family servant.
 Spalovač mrtvol (Literally "The incinerator of corpses" or "The Cremator") -1967: A psychological horror story about a worker in a crematorium, who, through the influence of Nazi propaganda and oriental philosophy, becomes a maniac, and murders his entire family to "cleanse them" by death. It was made into a famous film with Rudolf Hrušínský as the main actor, co-written by Fuks. 
 Smrt morčete (The Death of a hamster) -1969: A collection of 10 balladic short stories with Jewish motifs.
 Myši Natálie Mooshabrové (The mice of Natalia Mooshabr) -1970.
 Příběh kriminálního rady (The tale of a criminal counsel) -1971.
 Oslovení ze tmy (Addressing from the darkness) -1972
 Nebožtíci na bále (The Deceased at a ball) -1972
 Návrat z žitného pole (The return from the rye field) -1974
 Mrtvý v podchodu (March of the dead) -1976
 Pasáček z doliny (The (little) herdsman from the lowland) -1977 *
 The word herdsman is in the original in the form that would suggest a child)
 Křišťálový pantoflíček (The Crystal slipper) -1978.
 Obraz Martina Blaskowitze (The Picture of Martin Blaskowitz) -1980.
 Vévodkyně a kuchařka (The Duchess and the (female) cook) -1983.
 Cesta do zaslíbené země (Journey to the promised land) -1990
 Moje zrcadlo (My mirror) -1995: Memoirs, published posthumously.

References

External links
 Information on Works 
 Biographical Information 
 

Czech male novelists
Charles University alumni
Gay novelists
Writers from Prague
1923 births
1994 deaths
Czech gay writers
Czech LGBT novelists
Czech short story writers
Gay memoirists
Male short story writers
Psychological fiction writers
Czechoslovak World War II forced labourers